Saint-Laurent-du-Pont is a commune in the Isère department in southeastern France. It was the site of the Club Cinq-Sept fire, which killed 146, in 1970.

Population

Economy
There is a large cement works at Saint-Laurent-du-Pont, unusually inside a national park.

Twin towns — sister cities
Saint-Laurent-du-Pont is twinned with:

  Herdorf, Germany (1984)
  Berbenno, Italy (1985)

See also
Communes of the Isère department

References

Communes of Isère
Isère communes articles needing translation from French Wikipedia